Robert Xavier Rodríguez (born June 28, 1946) is an American classical composer, best known for his eight operas and his works for children.

Life and career 
Rodríguez received his early musical education in his native San Antonio and in Austin (University of Texas at Austin), Los Angeles (University of Southern California), Lenox (Tanglewood), Fontainebleau (Conservatoire Americain) and Paris.  His teachers have included Nadia Boulanger, Jacob Druckman, Bruno Maderna  and Elliott Carter. Rodríguez first gained international recognition in 1971, when he was awarded the Prix de Composition Musicale Prince Pierre de Monaco by Prince Rainier and Princess Grace at the Palais Princier in Monte Carlo.  Other honors include the Prix Lili Boulanger, a Guggenheim Fellowship, and the Goddard Lieberson Award from the American Academy and Institute of Arts and Letters. Rodríguez has served as Composer-in-Residence with the San Antonio Symphony (1996–99) and the Dallas Symphony (1982, Meet the Composer Orchestra Residency Program).  He currently holds the Endowed Chair of University Professor of Music at the University of Texas at Dallas. His music is published by G. Schirmer and is recorded on the Newport, Crystal, Orion, Gasparo, Urtext, ACA Digital, CRI, First Edition, Naxos and Albany labels.

Rodríguez’ music has been performed by conductors such as Sir Neville Marriner, Antal Dorati, Eduardo Mata, James DePriest, Sir Raymond Leppard, Keith Lockhart and Leonard Slatkin.  His work has received orchestral and operatic performances in recent seasons by such organizations as the Vienna Schauspielhaus, The National Opera of Mexico, New York City Opera, Brooklyn Academy of Music, Boston Repertory Theater, American Music Theater Festival (now Prince Music Theater), Dallas Opera, Houston Grand Opera, Pennsylvania Opera Theater, Michigan Opera Theatre, Orlando Opera, Florida Grand Opera, The Aspen Music Festival, The Juilliard Focus Series, The Israel Philharmonic Orchestra, Mexico City Philharmonic, Toronto Radio Orchestra, The Baltimore, Dallas, Houston, San Antonio, Knoxville, Indianapolis, St. Louis, Pittsburgh, Milwaukee, Boston and Chicago Symphonies, The Los Angeles Philharmonic, National Symphony, Los Angeles Chamber Orchestra, Louisville Orchestra and Cleveland Orchestra.

Works

Opera, theater and dance
La Curandera (2006) - opera (Libretto: Mary Medrick)
A Midsummer Night’s Dream (2001) - Incidental Music (Text: Shakespeare)
The Tempest (2000) - Concert Dramatization (Text: Shakespeare)
The Last Night of Don Juan (2000) - Musical Play (Text: Murray Ross, after Rostand, Zorilla)
Meta 4 (1994) - Ballet/String Quartet
Frida (1991, rev. 93) - opera (Libretto: Hillary Blecher, Migdalia Cruz)
The Old Majestic (1988) - opera (Libretto: Mary Medrick)
Monkey See, Monkey Do (1986) - opera for children (Libretto: Mary Medrick)
The Ransom of Red Chief  (1986) - opera for children (Libretto: Daniel Dibbern after O. Henry)
Tango (1985) - opera/theater piece (Text: Newsclippings)
The Seven Deadly Sins  (1984) - Ballet /Wind Ensemble
Suor Isabella (1982) - opera (Libretto: Daniel Dibbern, after Boccaccio)
Le Diable Amoureux (1978) - opera (Frans Boerlage, after Cazotte)
Favola Concertante (1975, rev. 77) - ballet/ concerto for violin, cello and string orchestra

Orchestra
Fanfarria Son-Risa (2014)
De Rerum Natura (2013)
Canción de los niños (2007) for Children's Chorus and Orchestra
Agnus Dei for Mozart's Mass in C-Minor (2006) for Soloists and Orchestra
Musical Dice Game (2005) for Two String Quartets and Two String Orchestras
Flight (2002) for Narrator and Orchestra (Text: Sukey Smith)
The Tempest  (2000) for Actors and Orchestra (Text: Shakespeare)
Bachanale: Concertino for Orchestra (1999)
Las Mañanitas de los Niños (1999)
Praline and Fudge (1998) for Bass and Chamber Orchestra (Texts: Cookbooks)
Forbidden Fire  (1998) for Bass, Chorus and Orchestra (Texts: Bible, various sources)
Sinfonia a la Mariachi (1997) for Double Orchestra
Trilogica (Pinata, Tango di Tango, Hot Buttered Rumba) (1996)
Hot Buttered Rumba (1996)
Scrooge (1994) for Bass, Chorus and Orchestra (Text: Dickens)
Adoracion Ambulante/Fanfare/Con Flor y Canto (1994)  for Soloists, Chorus and Orchestra (Text: Bible, Popol Vuh)
Mascaras (1993) for Cello and Orchestra
Pinata (1991)
Ursa (1990) for Contrabass and Orchestra
A Gathering of Angels: Bolero for Orchestra  (1989)
Invocation of Orpheus  (1989) for Trumpet, Harp and Strings
A Colorful Symphony (1987) for Narrator and Orchestra -Text: Norton Juster (The Phantom Tollbooth)
We, the People (original title Jargon) (1987) for Narrator, Chorus and Orchestra (Text: Mary Medrick)
Tango di Tango  (1985)
Varmi'ts! (1985) for Narrator, Chorus and Orchestra (Text: Texas Tall Tales)
The Seven Deadly Sins  (1984) for orchestra (also version for wind ensemble)
Oktoechos: Concerto Grosso (1983)
Trunks (1983) for Narrator and Orchestra (Text: Composer)
Semi-Suite (1981) for Violin and Chamber Orchestra
Estampie (1981) for Chamber Orchestra
Transfigurationis Mysteria (1980) for Narrator, Soloists, Chorus and Orchestra (Text: Bible)
Favola Boccaccesca  (1979)
The Salutation Rag (1978)
Four Advent Chorale-Preludes by J. S. Bach (arr.1978)for Chorus and Orchestra
Favola Concertante (1975, rev. 77) for Violin, Cello and String Orchestra
Sinfonia Concertante (1974) for Soprano Saxophone and Chamber Orchestra
Concerto III for Piano and Orchestra  (1974)
Canto (1973) for Soprano, Tenor and Chamber Orchestra (Text: Dante, Anonymous French)
Il Combattimento di Tancredi e Clorinda by Claudio Monteverdi (arr.1973)
Concert Suite from ‘L’Orfeo’ by Claudio Monteverdi (arr. 1973)
Concert Suite from ‘L’Incoronazione di Poppea’ by Claudio Monteverdi (arr.1972)
Lyric Variations (1971) for Oboe and String Orchestra
Adagio for Small Orchestra (1967)

Chamber
Above All, Women: Four Images of Gustav Klimt for String Quartet (2016)
Alle(...)luia - Variations (1987) for Organ and Chimes
Apache Wedding Blessing (2006) for Voice and Guitar
Arabesque by Robert Schumann (arr. RXR, 2010) for 2 Guitars
As: A Surfeit of Similes for SATB Chorus and Piano Solo (2014)
Aspen Sketches (1992) for Piano
Bachanale (1999) for 2 Pianos
Canto (1982) (It/Fr) for Soprano, Tenor, and Ensemble (Text: Dante and anonymous French)
Capriccio on the Departure of a Beloved Brother by J.S. Bach (arr. RXR, 1976) for 2, 3 or 4 Guitars
Caprichos (2012) for Piano Solo
Chronies (1981) for Bass Clarinet and Percussion
Cinco Poemas de García Lorca (1975) (Sp) for Mezzo-Soprano, Tenor, and Piano
Concert Suite from Frida (1993) (En/Sp) for Mezzo-Soprano and Ensemble or Piano (Text: Hillary Blecher, Migdalia Cruz)
Concert Suite from Suor Isabella (1983) for Soprano and Ensemble (Text: Daniel Dibbern)
El día de los muertos (2006) for 8 percussionists
Dolorosa et Lacrimabilis Es, Virgo Maria (1980) for Mixed Chorus, Soprano, Flute, and Windchimes
The Dot and the Line (2005) for Narrator and Chamber Ensemble (Text: Norton Juster)
Ductia (1980, rev. 83) for Harp, Harp Duo, Flute and Harp, or other combinations
Estampie (1981) for Clarinet, Cello, Percussion, and Piano; version for Piano Solo
Fantasia Lussuriosa (1989) for Piano
Favola Concertante (1977) for Piano Trio
Favola I, Episode from Favola Concertante (1977) for Cello
Favola II, Episodes from Favola Boccaccesca (1980) for Clarinet, Cello, and Piano
Five Etudes from Oktoechos (1983) 1. for Clarinet and Bassoon, 2. for Trumpet and Trombone, 3. for Piano Solo, 4. for Violin and Percussion, 5. for Cello Solo
The Food of Love (2004) for Violin/Actor and Piano (Text: William Shakespeare)
For Piano I and II (1978) for Piano
Four Poems from ‘Neue Gedichte’ (1971) (Gr) for soprano or tenor and piano (Text: Rainer Maria Rilke)
Frammenti Musicali (1978) for Flute and Piano or for Piano Solo
Gambits, Six Chess Pieces (2001) for Horn and Piano or Tuba and Piano 
Improvisation Matrix (1978) for Any Instrument or Combination of Instruments or for Piano Solo or Multiple Pianos
Invocation of Orpheus (1989) for Trumpet, Harp, and String Quartet or for Trumpet and Piano
Il Lamento di Tristano (1997) for Flute and Guitar
Lull-A-Bear from Ursa (1993) for Cello (or Bassoon) and Piano
Máscaras (1993) for Cello and Chamber Ensemble
Medieval Suite (1983) from the ballet Estampie for Horn, Violin, and Piano
Meditation (1981) for Flute, Clarinet, Cello, and Percussion
Menasherie (2015) for SSA Chorus and Piano Solo
Meta 4 (1994) Ballet for String Quartet
A Midsummer Night’s Dream (2001) – Incidental Music for the Shakespeare Play 
Mirror Sonnets (1989) for One, Two or Three Sopranos and Guitar or Piano (Text: Fred Curchack)
Música, por un tiempo (2008) for B-flat Clarinet, Violin, Cello, and Piano
My Lady Carey’s Dompe (1985) Variations on an Elizabethan Melody for Piccolo Trumpet, Descant Horn and Keyboard (Harpsichord or Piano)
Les Niais Amoureux (1989) for Clarinet and Piano Trio
Omaggio al Divino (2009) for Two Guitars
Plaisir d’Amour (1982) - after the song by Padre Martini for Flute, Clarinet, and Bassoon
Praline and Fudge (1979) - Recitative and Aria in Baroque Style for Bass Voice and Piano (Text: from Cookbooks)
Presences (1973) (Fr) for Soprano or Tenor and Piano (Text: Peter Clothier, trans. by Lucile Golson)
Quodlibet on Medieval Tunes (1978) for any number of players on any combination of instruments
The Salutation Rag (1976, rev. 79) for Piano 4-hands
Semi-Suite (1980) for Piano, 4-hands
Semi-Suite (1981) for Violin and Piano (plus Clarinet and Percussion ad lib)
Seven Deadly Sequences (1990) for Piano
Six Episodes from The Ransom of Red Chief (1987) for Piano
Six Maxims de La Rochefoucauld (1991) (Fr) for Voice and Piano
Six Songs of E.E. Cummings (2008) for Soprano and Marimba or Soprano and Piano
Son Risa (2006) for Solo Harp
Sonata in One Movement (1973) for Soprano Saxophone (or Clarinet) and Piano
Sonatina d’Estate (1982) for Flute and Piano
The Song of Songs (Shir Hashirim) (1992) for Soprano, Narrator, and Ensemble (Text: Sholom Aleichem [trans. by Curt Leviant] and the Bible)
Sor(tri)lège: Trio III (2007) for Piano Trio
Tango (1985) for Tenor and Chamber Ensemble (Libretto (En) by the Composer from 1913-14 news clippings)
Tango di Tango (1985) for Violin, Accordion and Piano or for Piano Solo
Tango Sueño (1986), Lullaby for Piano
Tentado por la samba (2007) for Cello and Piano
Three Lullabies (1990) for Piano or Guitar (transcribed for guitar by Enric Madriguera)
Three Songs and A Monologue from As You Like It (1990) for Voice and Piano
Toccata for Guitar Quartet  (1976) 
Toccata for Guitar Solo  (1983) (transcribed by Robert Guthrie)
Toccata for Percussion Quintet (1977)
Trio I (1971) for Piano Trio
Trio II (1970) for Piano Trio
The Versatility Rag (2006) for Piano Solo
Xochiquetzal (2014) for Violin and Percussion Sextet
Xochiquetzal (2015) for Violin and Piano

Recordings 
Remembranzas de mi Guitarra / Tango Amor, Three Lullabies - Enric Madriguera, Guitar; Albany, TROY 1600
Música, por un tiempo: SOLI Chamber Ensemble/Música, por un tiempo  - SOLI; Albany, TROY 1505
Robert Xavier Rodríguez: Works for Piano / Caprichos, Fantasia Lussuriosa, Estampie, Seven Deadly Sequences, Semi-Suite, Hot Buttered Rumba - Jeff Lankov, Piano; Albany, TROY 1477
Robert Xavier Rodriguez: Complete Works for Cello and Piano / Tentado por la samba, Máscaras, Ursa, Favola I, Lull-A-Bear - Jesus Castro-Balbi, Cello and Gloria Lin, Piano; Albany, TROY 1355
Chamber Works / Meta 4, Trio III: Sor(tri)lege, Trio II, Trio I - Colorado Quartet, Clavier Trio, Voices of Change. Albany, TROY 1136
American Music for Percussion 1 / El día de los muertos  - New England Conservatory Percussion Ensemble; Frank Epstein, Conductor; Naxos 8.559683
Robert Xavier Rodríguez: Works for Chorus & Orchestra / Forbidden Fire, Con Flor y Canto, Scrooge - George Cordes, Baritone; Rodney Nolan, Tenor; University of Miami Symphony Orchestra and Chorus; Miami Children's Chorus; Thomas M. Sleeper, Conductor.  Albany, TROY 430
Robert Xavier Rodríguez: Meet the Composer Recording / Oktoechos – Dallas Symphony Orchestra; Eduardo Mata, Conductor / Favola Boccaccesca – Louisville Orchestra; Lawrence Leighton Smith, Conductor / The Song of Songs – Voices of Change, Irene Gubrud, Soprano; Fred Curchack, Actor; Robert Xavier Rodríguez, Conductor. First Edition, FECD-0027
Musical Theater Works/ Tango – Rafael Alvarez, Tenor / Concert Suite from Frida – Angelina Réaux, Soprano; Voices of Change; Robert Xavier Rodríguez, Conductor CRI, CD824
Voces Americanas: Works by Robert Xavier Rodriguez, Mario Lavista, Roberto Sierra, Mario Davidovsky, Tania Leon./ Les Niais Amoureux - Emanuel Borok, Violin; Ross Powell, Clarinet; Christopher Adkins, Cello; Jo Boatright, Piano; Voices of Change.  CRI 773.  (Nominated for the 1999 Grammy Award for "Best Small Ensemble Performance".)
Celebration Of Flight: Works by William Bolcom, Steven Winteregg, Michael Schelle, and Robert Xavier Rodríguez / Flight - Allison Janney, narrator; Dayton Philharmonic; Neal Gittleman, conductor. Albany, TROY 672 
Laugh, Regardless of Creed : Works of Louis Gruenberg,  Alla Borzova, Robert Xavier Rodríguez and Larry Alan Smith / Tango – Paul Sperry, Tenor; Members of the San Diego Symphony Orchestra; Robert Xavier Rodríguez, Conductor. Albany, TROY 740
American Music for Percussion 1 / El día de los muertos - New England Conservatory Percussion Ensemble; Frank Epstein, Conductor; Naxos 8.559683
Le Grand Tango: Works of Astor Piazzolla, Alberto Ginastera, Heitor Villa-Lobos, Federico Ibarra, Robert Xavier Rodríguez and Manuel Enríquez / Lull-A-Bear - Carlos Prieto, Cello; Edison Quintana, Piano. Urtext, JBCC014
American Contemporary Chamber Music: Works of William Kraft, Robert Xavier Rodríguez, Larry Alan Smith and Dan Welcher /  Chronies, Meditation - Voices of Change. Crystal, CD704
Rachmaninov Suites / Bachanale (version for two pianos) - Miwako Takeda & Nobuhito Nakai, Pianos; Pro Arte Musicae, 2008.9.27
Encantamiento / Son Risa - Elisabeth Remy Johnson, Harp; ACA Digital, CM20103
I Loved Lucy /  Il Lamento di Tristano - Susan DeJong, Flute; Jeffrey Van, Guitar; Duologue. Gasparo, GSCD-348
Americans in Paris /  Six Maxims de la Rochefoucauld - Hillary Hight Daw, Soprano; Barbara Elfrid, Piano. ACA Digital
Seven World Premieres / Tentado por la samba - Carlos Prieto, Cello; Doris Stephenson, Piano. Urtext, JBCC 183

Notes

References

 Linda Navarro, Opera in two tongues: 'Curandera' connects with crowd in Spanish, English, Colorado Gazette, May 18, 2007. Retrieved via subscription 21 February 2008.
 Kerri Allen, Extraordinary Composer Robert Xavier Rodríguez at UTD, The Hispanic Outlook in Higher Education,  November 6, 2006. Retrieved via subscription 21 February 2008.
 Bob Bows, 'La Curandera' (Opera review),Variety, May 29, 2006
 Marc Shulgold, Can opera magic conjure new fans? Rocky Mountain News, May 13, 2006. Retrieved 21 February 2008.
 
 John Rockwell,Concert Review ('Tango'): A Conductor With a Flair for the Contemporary , New York Times, January 12, 1990,

External links
 Robert Xavier Rodríguez official site
 Biography on G. Schirmer/Music Sales
 Biography, University of Texas at Dallas
 Biography on Sigma Alpha Iota Philanthropies.

1946 births
Living people
University of Texas at Austin College of Fine Arts alumni
USC Thornton School of Music alumni
American male classical composers
American classical composers
American musicians of Mexican descent
American opera composers
Male opera composers
People from San Antonio
Classical musicians from Texas
Hispanic and Latino American musicians